Anthony Louis Feltrin (born December 6, 1961 in Ladysmith, British Columbia) is a retired ice hockey defenceman. He played in the National Hockey League for the Pittsburgh Penguins and New York Rangers.

After his retirement, Feltrin works as a scout for the St. Louis Blues.

Personal life
After Feltrin married his wife Kelly they moved to Cowichan Lake. In June 2018 he was inducted into the Cowichan Lake Heritage Sports Wall of Fame.

Career statistics

References

External links
 

1961 births
Living people
People from the Cowichan Valley Regional District
Baltimore Skipjacks players
Canadian expatriate ice hockey players in the United States
Canadian ice hockey defencemen
Erie Blades players
Ice hockey people from British Columbia
Nanaimo Clippers players
New Haven Nighthawks players
New York Islanders scouts
New York Rangers players
New York Rangers scouts
People from Ladysmith, British Columbia
Pittsburgh Penguins players
Pittsburgh Penguins draft picks
St. Louis Blues scouts
Salt Lake Golden Eagles (CHL) players
Salt Lake Golden Eagles (WHL) players
Victoria Cougars (WHL) players